Ken Ng (born 1 March 1951) is the president of Hong Kong Premier League club Kitchee. He is a former referee and a former member of the Hong Kong First Division board. Ng, along with Steven Lo, Chan Man Chun, and Chan Tin Yau, formed the preparation committee for the establishment of the Premier League.

Career 
Ken started his referee career when he was studying in Canada. He started refereeing in Hong Kong in 1981. He was also being nominated as a FIFA referee.

In November 1990, Ng, in his individual name, wrote a letter to impeach the internal affairs of the Hong Kong Football Association. He then received a three-month ban and his name was removed from the FIFA referee list. Two referees thought that the punishment was too severe and applied to the High Court for an injunction. The HKFA and the referees then accepted reconciliation and retired as a referee in 1992.

In 1994, Ken was invited to manage Kitchee. Although the club were relegated that season, he was invited to manage Instant-Dict football club by Tam Wai Tong because of his good management.

Ken Ng became the general manager of Kitchee in 2000 and under this stewardship, the club was promoted to First Division in 2003.

References

External links 
 Ken Ng on Facebook

1951 births
Kitchee SC
Living people
Hong Kong football referees
Kitchee SC managers
Hong Kong football managers